

Boc I 

The Boc Cabinet was a coalition cabinet between the largest parliamentary parties, PD-L and the PSD. After the breakup of the legislative coalition, it was known as ”the first Boc Cabinet.” Despite the ambitious governing program, numerous conflicts erupted between the PDL and PSD leaders, each party blaming the other. In particular, president Traian Băsescu and Mircea Geoană, the leader of PSD, competed for the presidential elections in 2009. The coalition cabinet lasted less than one year.

Following the resignation of Liviu Dragnea (PSD) from the office of Minister of Administration and Interior, on 2 February 2009, the Parliament voted to unify the post of Deputy Prime Minister with the post of Minister of Administration and Interior.

On 1 October 2009, following the removal from office of the Deputy Prime Minister, Minister of Administration and Interior, Dan Nica (PSD), all the PSD Ministers resigned from the cabinet. As a result, all their offices were taken, ad interim by the PD-L, for a period no longer than 45 days. The cabinet should have received a new vote from the Parliament, as its political composition was changed. On 13 October 2009, for the first time in the post-communist history, the Parliament adopted a motion of no confidence (”moțiune de cenzură”), and Cabinet Boc was removed. It worked just an acting cabinet, with diminished power. Its term ended on 23 December 2009, when the new cabinet, headed also by Emil Boc received the vote of confidence from the Parliament and was sworn in at Cotroceni Palace. During the interim period, Traian Băsescu nominated repeatedly friendly candidates, despite the fact that the then opposition parties (PNL, PSD, UDMR, and the 18 representatives of the national ethnic minorities), having an absolute majority in both Houses of Parliament, expressed their will to nominate the Mayor of Sibiu Klaus Iohannis as Prime Minister.

Proposed Croitoru and Negoiță cabinets 

The Croitoru-proposed cabinet was Lucian Croitoru's proposal for the cabinet, composed of 14 ministers, listed below. It was proposed on 23 October 2009, and was rejected by the Parliament of Romania on 4 November 2009.

On 15 October 2009, President Traian Băsescu, citing the need for an individual well-versed in economic policy to steer Romania through the ongoing crisis, nominated the politically independent Lucian Croitoru as Prime Minister in place of Emil Boc, whose cabinet fell after losing a motion of no confidence two days earlier. The nomination was backed by the Democratic Liberal Party, which is supporting Băsescu in the upcoming presidential election, but drew criticism from the rest of the parties represented in the Romanian Parliament (the Social Democratic Party, the National Liberal Party, the Democratic Union of Hungarians in Romania and the Parliamentary group of ethnic minorities), which backed Sibiu Mayor Klaus Iohannis for the position, and vowed to challenge Croitoru's nomination at the Constitutional Court or derail it in Parliament. In a meeting with Croitoru on 20 October, the four Parliamentary groups told Croitoru they would not vote for a cabinet headed by him, and asked him to refuse the nomination as Prime Minister.

On 23 October, Croitoru announced his proposed cabinet, which included 14 ministers, down from 18 in Emil Boc cabinet. There were 7 holdovers, and 7 new names (in addition to Croitoru).

The Ministry of Youth and Sport would be merged with the Ministry of Education and Research and Innovation, the Ministry of Small and Medium Enterprises, Commerce and Business Environment which will be merged with the Ministry of Economy, the Ministry of Tourism which will be merged with the Ministry of Regional Development. Five current ministerial posts (of Youth and Sport, Small and Medium Enterprise, Tourism, Communications, and Relations with Parliament), as well as the post of Deputy Prime Minister would be cancelled.

Following the rejection by Parliament of the Croitoru Cabinet, dubbed in the press as the second Boc cabinet without Boc, President Băsescu nominated sector 3 Mayor Liviu Negoiță to form a new government. Due to the fact that the Cabinet structure was identical to, and that most of the ministers where the same as the ones of the first Boc cabinet, and the Croitoru (proposed) Cabinet, this new proposal was nicknamed by the media and analysts The Boc III Cabinet without Boc. This cabinet never received a vote from Parliament, and Negoiță renounced to the mandate days after the run-off of the presidential election, the first Boc cabinet being officially mandated as a caretaker government until a new cabinet would form.

Boc II 

On 23 December 2009 the new Boc Cabinet received, by a narrow margin, the vote of confidence of the Parliament, and was sworn in at Cotroceni later that day. The Government formed was a coalition government between the Democratic Liberal Party and the Democratic Union of Hungarians in Romania. It also received the (traditional) vote of the national minorities group in the Chamber of Deputies and of the two controversial groups of independents in both houses (Chamber of Deputies and Senate) of Parliament.

On 3 September 2010, Emil Boc announced a Cabinet reshuffle, replacing six Ministers. Due to the way the reshuffle was implemented, after two days of meetings and discussions, the media continued, albeit without any legal basis, the numbering of the reshuffled Cabinet as Boc V, the current Boc II Cabinet being dubbed by the press and civil society as Boc IV.

On 6 February 2012, he resigned from office, on the background of long ongoing street protests.

The members of the cabinet are listed below.

References 
 Romanian Presidency press release on 11 December 2009 
 Government official website

Cabinets of Romania
Coalition governments
2008 establishments in Romania
2012 disestablishments in Romania
Cabinets established in 2008
Cabinets disestablished in 2012